Handan Kurğa (born 10 September 1993) is a Turkish women's football goalkeeper currently playing in the Turkish Women's First Football League for Galatasaray in Istanbul with jersey number 17. She is a member of the Turkey women's national team.

Club career

Ataşehir Belediyespor 
Handan Kurğa obtained her license during her high school education on 11 May 2007. She became part of her high school's team Düvenciler Lisesispor, which played in the Turkish Women's Second Football League. In the 2009–10 season, the team was renamed Ataşehir Belediyespor and was promoted to the First League. The next season, her team won the league.championship.

Lüleburgaz 39 Spor 
After capping 28 times for Ataşehir Belediyespor, Kurğa transferred to Lüleburgaz 39 Spor in the 2011–12 season, where she played one season only because the team folded.

Konak Belediyespor 
From 19 October 2012 she was the substitute goalkeeper at the Izmir-based Konak Belediyespor, where she enjoyed twice consecutive league champion titles. She spent the games of the 2013–14 UEFA Champions League on the bench. She appeared in two of the three matches of the 2014–15 UEFA Women's Champions League qualifying matches. She appeared twice at the 2015–16 UEFA Women's Champions League qualifying round.

Ataşehir Belediyespor 
In August 2017 she transferred to her former club Ataşehir Belediyespor. At the end of the 2016–17 season, she enjoyed her team's league champion title.

ALG Spor 
In the beginning of the 2018-19 First league season's second half, Kurğa joined the recently promoted Gaziantep-based club ALG Spor. Her team finished the season equal on points with the league leader. They lost the play-off match, and became runners-up.

Konak Belediyespor 
In the 2019-20 Turkish Women's First Football League season, she transferred to her former club Konak Belediyespor.

Galatasaray 
On 10 August 2022, the Turkish Women's Football Super League team was transferred to the Galatasaray club.

International career 
Handan Kurğa became international with the Turkey girls' U-17 team in 2008. She was twice part of the Turkey women's U-19 team.

She debuted in the Turkey women's national football team in the 2019 FIFA Women's World Cup qualification – UEFA preliminary round match against Luxembourg on 8 April 2017.

Career statistics 
.

Honours 
Turkish Women's First League
 Ataşehir Belediyespor
 Winners (2): 2010–11, 2017–18

 Konak Belediyespor
Winners (5): 2012–13, 2013–14, 2014–15, 2015–16, 2016–17

 ALG Spor
Runners-up (1): 2018–19

References

External links

1993 births
Living people
People from Digor (District), Kars
Women's association football goalkeepers
Turkish women's footballers
Turkey women's international footballers
Ataşehir Belediyespor players
Lüleburgaz 39 Spor players
Konak Belediyespor players
ALG Spor players
Turkish Women's Football Super League players
Galatasaray S.K. women's football players